The following is a timeline of the Presidency of Maithripala Sirisena from his first announcement as presidential candidate in November 2014 to the present.

Pre-presidency

2014
November
 21 November: Sri Lanka Freedom Party general secretary and cabinet minister Maithripala Sirisena defects to the opposition and announces he would run against Mahinda Rajapaksa in the coming election. 
 21 November: Sirisena and the other UPFA MPs were stripped of their ministerial positions and expelled from the SLFP.

December
 1 December: On 1 December 2014 Sirisena signed a memorandum of understanding (MOU) with 36 opposition parties/civic groups promising to abolish the executive presidency, hold parliamentary elections, form an all-party national government and carry out various political reforms. Signatories to the MOU include the UNP, Sarath Fonseka's Democratic Party, Democratic People's Front, Azath Salley's Muslim Tamil National Alliance, Free Media Movement, Federation of University Teachers Association as well as dissident groups of the LSSP and Communist Party.
 2 December: The Jathika Hela Urumaya announces it will be supporting Sirisena in the presidential election.
 17 December: A stage that Sirisena had been intending to use for a campaign rally at Wanduramba near Galle was set on fire along with a vehicle by an unidentified group, and three workers installing the stage were abducted.
 19 December: At a rally at Viharamahadevi Park, Maithripala Sirisena released his manifesto, titled A Compassionate Maithri Governance — A Stable Country
 24 December: Sirisena's election office in Batticaloa was attacked in the morning by a group of around 30 unidentified people armed with firearms and petrol bombs.
 27 December: Sirisena's election office in Irrakandi was attacked during the night. 
 30 December: The Tamil National Alliance, the largest political party representing the Sri Lankan Tamil people, endorsed Sirisena.

2015
January
 2 January: An opposition rally in Pelmadulla was stoned by government supporters, seriously injuring at least 20, whilst Sirisena was addressing the rally.
 3 January: As Sirisena was leaving a rally at Aralaganwila a group of government supporters arrived in a jeep and fired shots at the rally, injuring a bystander and damaging vehicles.

Presidency

2015
January
 9 January: Around 8:06 (2:36 UTC)  Election commissioner confirmed Maithripala Sirisena as the new elected president.
 9 January: President Sirsena is sworn in as Sri Lanka's sixth executive president, and seventh overall, before Supreme Court judge K. Sripavan in Independence Square, Colombo at 6.20pm.
11 January: In his Inaugural address to the nation from Sri Dalada Maligawa, in Kandy, Sirisena invited all political parties to join to form a national unity government.
12 January: Sirisena forms an interim cabinet and calls the Parliamentary elections two years ahead of schedule for 23 April.
12 January: President Sirisena lifts a ban on news websites, blocked under his predecessor, and promised to enact a Right to Information bill.
 13 January: The Sirisena government replaces retired military officer G. A. Chandrasiri as Governor of Northern Province with retired diplomat and civil servant H. M. G. S. Palihakkara.
 16 January: President Sirisena, who is chairman of the Sri Lanka Freedom Party by virtue of his presidency, is handed over leadership of the SLFP by former president Mahinda Rajapaksa, saying he does not want to see his party divided, but has vowed to remain in active politics.
 27 January: President Sirisena calls for limiting the term of office of the President to 5 years from the current 6.
 29 January: President Sirisena assumes duties as Minister of Defence, in addition to being Commander-in-Chief.
 30 January: President Sirisena swears in Puisne Justice of the Supreme Court of Sri Lanka Kanagasabapathy Sripavan as the new Chief Justice, at the Presidential Secretariat.

February 
 2 February: President Sirisena outlines his plan for creating a drug-free Sri Lanka.
 4 February: President Sirisena presided over the 67th Independence Day Celebrations at the Parliament Grounds.
 10 February: President Sirisena announces the creation of a Presidential Commission to probe into corruption during that of the former government. Sirisena has appointed Supreme Court Justice Priyasath Dep to head a Commission.

See also

Presidency of Maithripala Sirisena
100-day reform program

References

Presidency of Maithripala Sirisena

Maithripala Sirisena
Sirisena, Maithripala